The Speewah is a mythical Australian station.

Speewa or Speewah may also refer to:
 Speewa, New South Wales
 Speewa, Victoria
 Speewah, Queensland